Acropolis is a monotypic butterfly genus from the subfamily Satyrinae in the family Nymphalidae. The one species in the genus, Acropolis thalia, is distributed in western subtropical China. The genus was erected by Francis Hemming in 1934 based on a species described by John Henry Leech in 1891.

Description
Adalbert Seitz wrote:

References

External links

Ragadiini
Monotypic butterfly genera
Taxa named by Francis Hemming
Butterflies described in 1891